Patricia Finney (born 1958) is an English author and journalist with Hungarian forebears.  She is a graduate of Oxford University (Wadham, 1977–80) with a degree in History. She has written under the pen names "P. F. Chisholm" and "Grace Cavendish".

Her first novel A Shadow of Gulls, published when she was 18, won the 1977 David Higham Award for Best First Novel of the year. In the same year BBC Radio 3 presented her play, The Flood.

As well as writing radio plays, such as A Room Full of Mirrors, Finney has published twenty-one novels, many of which are set in Elizabethan times. They include spy thrillers, crime novels and children's books. Finney has also published three books (the Jack series) written in "Doglish", the language of dogs.

Published works

Lugh Mac Romain Series

1. A Shadow of Gulls (1977)
2. The Crow Goddess (1978)

 
David Becket and Simon Ames Series
 
1. Firedrake's Eye (1992)
2. Unicorn's Blood (1998)
3. Gloriana's Torch (2003)

 
Robert Carey Series (writing as P. F. Chisholm)

1. A Famine of Horses (1994)
2. A Season of Knives (1995)
3. A Surfeit of Guns (1996)
4. A Plague of Angels (1998)
5. A Murder of Crows (2010)
6. An Air of Treason (2014)
7. A Chorus of Innocents (2015)
8. A Clash of Spheres  (2017)
9. A Suspicion of Silver (2018)

Lady Grace Cavendish Series (writing as Grace Cavendish)

1. Assassin (2004)
2. Betrayal (2004)
3. Conspiracy (2004)
6. Feud (2006)

Jack Series
1. I, Jack (2000)
2. Jack and Police Dog Rebel (2002) 
3. Jack and the Ghosts (2013)

References

External links
 Patricia Finney's Blog
 Patricia Finney's Website

20th-century English writers
1958 births
Living people
21st-century English writers
Pseudonymous women writers
Writers of historical mysteries
20th-century English women writers
21st-century English women writers
20th-century pseudonymous writers
21st-century pseudonymous writers
Alumni of Wadham College, Oxford